Holy Cross Cemetery may refer to:

United States

California 
Holy Cross Cemetery (Colma, California)
Holy Cross Cemetery, Culver City, California

 Holy Cross Cemetery (Menlo Park, California)

Holy Cross Cemetery (Pomona, California)
Holy Cross Cemetery (San Diego), Chollas View neighborhood, San Diego, California

Illinois 
Holy Cross Cemetery, Calumet City, Illinois

Michigan 
Holy Cross Cemetery, Detroit, Michigan

Montana 
Holy Cross Cemetery (Broadwater County, Montana)
Holy Cross Cemetery (Silver Bow County, Montana)
Holy Cross Cemetery (Yellowstone County, Montana)

New Jersey 
Holy Cross Cemetery (North Arlington, New Jersey)

New York 
Holy Cross Cemetery, Brooklyn, New York, New York

Ohio 
Holy Cross Cemetery, Brook Park, Ohio

Pennsylvania 
Holy Cross Cemetery, Harrisburg, Pennsylvania
Holy Cross Cemetery (Yeadon, Pennsylvania), in Yeadon, Pennsylvania

Virginia 
Holy Cross Cemetery, Lynchburg, Virginia

Wisconsin 
Holy Cross Cemetery (Milwaukee), Wisconsin

Canada
Holy Cross Cemetery (Edmonton), Alberta, Canada
Holy Cross Cemetery (Halifax, Nova Scotia), Canada
Holy Cross Cemetery, Thornhill, Ontario, Canada

Elsewhere 
Holy Cross Catholic Cemetery, a private cemetery in Cape Collinson, Hong Kong
Žale, formerly known as Holy Cross Cemetery, in Ljubljana, Slovenia